Novak Djokovic was the defending champion, and won in the final 7–5, 5–7, 6–3, against Mikhail Youzhny.

Seeds

Draw

Finals

Top half

Bottom half

Qualifying

Seeds

Qualifiers

Lucky loser

Draw

First qualifier

Second qualifier

Third qualifier

Fourth qualifier

External links 
Main Draw
Qualifying Draw

2010 Dubai Tennis Championships
Dubai Tennis Championships - Men's Singles